Alec Puro (born April 25, 1975), also known as Alec Püre, is an American drummer, songwriter and composer. As well as being the drummer for Deadsy, Puro has composed music for numerous television shows and films.

Career
Puro is best known for scoring the drama series The Fosters and Black Summer, as well as several films including The Art of Getting By (2011), starring Freddie Highmore, and Higher Ground (2011), directed by Vera Farmiga. A veteran of the indie film world, he composed the music for the comedy All Nighter (2017), starring Emile Hirsch and J.K. Simmons, and A Happening of Monumental Proportions (2017), Judy Greer's directorial debut.

In 1996, Puro formed the rock band Deadsy with longtime friend Elijah Blue Allman and Renn Hawkey. After their first album was released, the band embarked upon several world tours, opening for bands such as Linkin Park and Stone Temple Pilots. During his time with Deadsy, Puro also began composing music for various films and television shows. Since 2007, Puro's film work has been a regular fixture at some of the world's most integral film festivals, from SXSW to Cannes to the Tribeca Film Festival.

Puro founded Gramoscope Music in 2006. Some projects they have created music for include the new theme for Real Time with Bill Maher, American Horror Story, So You Think You Can Dance, Running Wild with Bear Grylls, Wicked Tuna, Glee, and Burn Notice.

Personal life
Puro has been married to actress Marla Sokoloff since November 7, 2009. Puro and Sokoloff have three daughters, born February 2012 March 2015 and February 2022.

Filmography

Film

Television

Video games

References

External links
 Gramoscope Music
 

20th-century American composers
1975 births
American male songwriters
Living people
Place of birth missing (living people)
Deadsy members
20th-century American drummers
American male drummers
American male composers
21st-century American drummers
20th-century American male musicians
21st-century American male musicians